Woman Wanted is a 1935 American crime drama film directed by George B. Seitz and starring Maureen O'Sullivan and Joel McCrea. Written by Leonard Fields and David Silverstein, the film is about a woman wrongly convicted of murder who escapes with the help of a young lawyer who hides her from the police and the mobsters who set her up.

Plot summary

Cast
 Maureen O'Sullivan as Ann Gray
 Joel McCrea as Tony Baxter
 Lewis Stone as District Attorney Martin
 Louis Calhern as Smiley Gordon
 Edgar Kennedy as Sweeney
 Adrienne Ames as Betty Randolph
 Robert Greig as Peedles
 Noel Madison as Joe Metz
 William B. Davidson as Collins 
 Richard Powell as Lee
 Erville Alderson as Constable 
 Gertrude Short as Gertie
 All primary cast members are deceased.

References

External links

 
 
 
 

1935 films
1935 crime drama films
American crime drama films
American black-and-white films
1930s English-language films
Films directed by George B. Seitz
Metro-Goldwyn-Mayer films
1930s American films